"She Came from Fort Worth" is a song written by Pat Alger and Fred Koller, and recorded by American country music artist Kathy Mattea.  It was released in April 1990 as the fourth single from the album Willow in the Wind.  The song reached #2 on the Billboard Hot Country Singles & Tracks chart.

Chart performance

Year-end charts

References

Songs about Texas
1990 singles
Kathy Mattea songs
Songs written by Pat Alger
Songs written by Fred Koller
Song recordings produced by Allen Reynolds
Mercury Records singles
1989 songs